P57 may refer to:

Aircraft 
 Partenavia P.57 Fachiro, an Italian civil utility aircraft
 Percival P.57 Sea Prince, a British anti-submarine trainer
 Tucker XP-57, a proposed American fighter

Vessels 
 , a submarine of the Royal Navy
 , a patrol vessel of the Indian Navy
 P57 Kasos, a HSY-55-class gunboat of the Hellenic Navy

Other uses 
 P57 (glycoside), an anorectic
 BRM P57, a Formula One racing car
 Cyclin-dependent kinase inhibitor 1C
 Papyrus 57, a biblical manuscript
 P57, a state regional road in Latvia